Desierto is a 2015 thriller drama film co-written and directed by Jonás Cuarón. It was produced by Cuarón together with his father Alfonso and his uncle Carlos, and distributed by STXfilms. The film stars Gael García Bernal (also executive producer) and Jeffrey Dean Morgan. It was shown in the Special Presentations section of the 2015 Toronto International Film Festival, where it won the Prize of the International Federation of Film Critics (FIPRESCI) for Special Presentations, and was selected as the Mexican entry for the Best Foreign Language Film at the 89th Academy Awards but it was not nominated.

Plot
A group of Mexican migrant workers seek a better life by crossing the US border illegally; when the truck carrying them breaks down in the middle of nowhere, the driver points the migrants and his partner Mechas in the direction of the United States and wishes them luck. Moises (Gael García Bernal) is also a member of the migrants and follows as the group splits in two while trying to pass the border.

Sam (Jeffrey Dean Morgan) is a merciless, rifle-toting vigilante who, with his faithful but vicious Malinois dog, Tracker, hunts for rabbits near the border and notices the group trespassing; with the help of Tracker and the use of his M1 Garand rifle, Sam kills most of the group, including Mechas and leaves Moises and Adela (Alondra Hidalgo) as the sole survivors after a long chase. Unable to follow the last two, Sam decides to continue his hunt the next day and leaves with Tracker.

Adela and Moises find a spot to rest, with Adela confessing to Moises that her companion, who was one Sam's victims, was sent by her parents to protect her and even though he molested her during their journey, he didn't deserve to die that way. Moises confesses to Adela that he had already been to the USA and that he has a family waiting for him in Oakland, showing a talking teddy bear which his son gave to him before being deported, and that Moises promised him he would bring it back. Meanwhile, Sam rests by a campfire with Tracker, describing to his loyal dog how he used to love the desert but now the heat is playing with his mind and he wants to escape from it.

The next morning Adela and Moises steal Sam's truck, using the teddy bear to distract Sam and Tracker. The duo manage to start the truck and seem to have finally escaped when Sam shoots Adela in the shoulder, causing Moises to crash the truck. They continue on foot, followed by Sam and Tracker. Moises stops to take care of Adela's wound, then tells her he has to leave her and takes Sam's jacket and flare gun with him. Moises has a change of heart and uses a round of the flare gun to distract Sam from Adela; Tracker closely pursues Moises in a cactus field where Moises is forced to use the flare gun on Tracker and shoot him in the mouth before escaping; Sam finds a mortally wounded Tracker and reluctantly shoots him to end his suffering before swearing vengeance on Moises.

After a long time chasing Moises as they are climbing on a rock structure, Sam is dehydrated and tired; Moises hides between the rocks and pushes Sam as he is standing on the edge, causing both of them to fall and breaking Sam's leg in the process. Both try to reach the rifle, but Moises takes it and menaces Sam with the rifle for murdering so many people and trying to kill Moises and Adela as Sam begs for his life, for forgiveness, and for water. Instead, Moises leaves with the rifle, telling Sam that the desert will kill him and leaves Sam to die despite his pleas for Moises to come back.

Moises returns for Adela; he finds her alive, but unconscious, and carries her until they cross a salt lake.

Cast
 Gael García Bernal as Moises
 Jeffrey Dean Morgan as Sam
 Alondra Hidalgo as Adela
  Diego Cataño as Mechas
 Marco Pérez as Lobo
 Oscar Flores as Ramiro
 David Lorenzo as Ulises
 Butch McCain as Radio Talker
 Lew Temple as a Border Patrol officer

Release
The film was first released at the Toronto International Film Festival in September 2015. In December 2015, STX Entertainment announced that it would release the film in North American theaters the following March. The film was released in France and Mexico in April 2016 and had grossed $2.8 million as of 15 May 2016. The North American release was delayed until 14 October 2016.

Reception

Critical response
The film holds a 63% approval rating on Rotten Tomatoes, based on 91 reviews with an average rating of 5.71/10. The site's consensus reads "Desierto's thought-provoking themes and refreshing perspective are unfortunately offset by a predictable plot and thinly written characters." On Metacritic, the film has a score of 51 out of 100, based on 24 critics, indicating "mixed or average reviews".

Dave Robinson of outlet Crash Landed reviewed the home entertainment release of Desierto awarding it 3 stars, taking note of its technical acumen in providing a thriller, but its "ill-defined script accomplishing nothing beyond passive entertainment" and of special note its complete lack of special features.

See also
 List of submissions to the 89th Academy Awards for Best Foreign Language Film
 List of Mexican submissions for the Academy Award for Best Foreign Language Film

References

External links
 
 
 
 
 

2015 films
2015 drama films
2015 thriller drama films
2015 thriller films
2015 directorial debut films
2010s English-language films
2010s Spanish-language films
Mexican thriller films
Mexican thriller drama films
French thriller drama films
Films produced by Alfonso Cuarón
STX Entertainment films
2010s survival films
2010s French films
2010s Mexican films